Hüyük, also Höyük ("tumulus, burial mound"), is a town and district of Konya Province in the Central Anatolia region of Turkey. According to 2000 census, population of the district is 52,110 of which 8,472 live in the town of Hüyük.

Notes

References

External links
 District governor's official website 
 District municipality's official website 

Populated places in Konya Province
Hüyük District
Districts of Konya Province